The Zêzere is a river in Portugal, tributary to the Tagus. It rises in the Serra da Estrela, near the Torre, the highest point of continental Portugal. The Zêzere runs through the town Manteigas, runs through Belmonte, passes south of the city of Covilhã and east of the town of Pedrogão Grande. It flows into the Tagus in Constância. It is the second longest river entirely within Portuguese territory (the Mondego being the longest). Its slope allows for the hydroelectric powerplants of Cabril, Bouçã and Castelo de Bode.

Dams and Reservoirs 
Beginning at the headwaters, there are 3 dams on the Zêzere:

References

Rivers of Portugal
Tributaries of the Tagus
Ramsar sites in Portugal